General Sir Alan Jolly,  (12 November 1910 – 15 September 1977) was a senior officer of the British Army who served as Quartermaster-General to the Forces from 1966 to 1969.

Early career
Jolly joined the British Army and was commissioned into the Royal Tank Corps in 1931. He served on the North-West Frontier in India from 1936 to 1937.

Second World War
During the Second World War Jolly was appointed commanding officer of the 144th Regiment Royal Armoured Corps (144 RAC, previously the 8th Battalion of the East Lancashire Regiment) on 10 April 1944, and led it throughout the campaign in North-West Europe. The regiment landed in Normandy on 14 June 1944 and first went into action during Operation Pomegranate, supporting an infantry attack on Noyers. The advance was badly hampered by minefields (both Allied and German), and 144 RAC had many tanks disabled by 'friendly' mines. This seriously reduced the force that could be used. The Official History records that "Noyers was attacked again and again" for two days, but the garrison held out, except around the station and Point 126, which was taken at bayonet point by 'A' Company of the 2/6th Battalion, South Staffordshire Regiment, following 'A' Squadron 144 RAC. Casualties to 144 RAC had been heavy and after the battle Jolly wrote a detailed report to highlight the tactical lessons learned. He became regarded as a good tactician, and infantry commanders bowed to his tactical judgement when planning joint operations.

On 8 September 1944 RAC supported the 51st (Highland) Division in the assault on the German-held French port of Le Havre (Operation Astonia). This difficult operation was successful. In October, Jolly was awarded the Distinguished Service Order. In January 1945, 144 RAC cooperated with the 53rd (Welsh) Division in the British counter-attacks against the northern side of the 'Bulge' developed by the German Ardennes offensive.

In January 1945, 144 RAC became part of 79th Armoured Division, which operated specialist armoured vehicles, and the regiment re-equipped with Buffalo LVT amphibious vehicles to begin training for the assault crossing of the Rhine.

On 1 March 1945, 144 RAC was redesignated 4th Royal Tank Regiment to replace the original 4th RTR, which had been captured at Tobruk in June 1942. Jolly took the salute at the final parade of 144 RAC on 28 February, having arranged for the band of the East Lancashire Regiment to play the regimental march (144 RAC had originally been the 8th Battalion of the East Lancs).

Jolly led the regiment under its new title in Operation Plunder, ferrying troops of the 51st (Highland) Division across the River Rhine on the night of 23/24 March 1945. On landing, Jolly had the satisfaction of planting the First World War standard of the original 4th RTR on the far bank.

Postwar career
Jolly was appointed Deputy Quartermaster General for British Army of the Rhine in 1957, General Officer Commanding (GOC) the 5th Division in 1959 and GOC 1st Division in 1960. He then became Chief of Staff for Southern Command in 1961 and Vice-Quartermaster-General at the War Office in 1962. He went on to be GOC Far East Land Forces in 1964; in this capacity he was able to report that, following British military intervention, there was hardly any terrorism in Malaysia by July 1965. He became Quartermaster-General to the Forces in 1966 and retired in 1969.

Notes

References
 Major L. F. Ellis, History of the Second World War: United Kingdom Military Series: Victory in the West, Volume I: The Battle of Normandy, London: HMSO, 1962/Uckfield: Naval & Military, 2004, .
 Major L.F. Ellis, History of the Second World War: United Kingdom Military Series: Victory in the West, Volume II: The Defeat of Germany, London: HMSO, 1968/Uckfield: Naval & Military, 2004, .
 Lt-Col Martin Lindsay, So Few Got Through, London: Collins, 1946/Arrow Books (pbk; nd)/Leo Cooper, 2000, . Page references are to Arrow edition.
 Tim Saunders, "Operation Plunder: The British and Canadian Rhine Crossing, Barnsley: Pen & Sword, 2006, .

|-
 

|-
 

1910 births
1977 deaths
Military personnel from Melbourne
Knights Grand Cross of the Order of the Bath
Commanders of the Order of the British Empire
Companions of the Distinguished Service Order
Royal Tank Regiment officers
British Army generals
British Army personnel of World War II